Stanisław Józef Albinowski (20 July 1923, Lwów – 25 January 2005, Warsaw) was a Polish economist, columnist and journalist on economics.

He was born in Lwów, Poland. During World War II he was a forced labourer for German companies in Nazi-occupied Poland (1940–1943) and Lithuania (Klaipėda, 1944).

In 1960 he graduated in economics from the Political Economics Division of Warsaw University (Wydzial Ekonomii Politycznej Uniwersystetu Warszawskiego).

He was a journalist for many Polish newspapers in years 1952–1980, and correspondent in Bonn, Germany (1968–1972).

Government expert 
Stanisław Albinowski was also a governmental experts groups working on reports on how to deal with economic crisis in Poland in the 1980s, participating in publications: The report on the economy (Raport o stanie gospodarki) and The programme to overcome the crisis, (Program przezwyciężenia kryzysu) in 1981.

Publications

Newspapers and magazines

For most of his life he was a columnist and journalist for the biggest Polish newspapers and magazines, including:

 Gazeta Wyborcza
 Kultura
 Po Prostu
 Polityka
 Prawo i Gospodarka
 Puls Biznesu
 Trybuna Ludu
 Zarządzanie
 Życie Gospodarcze
 Życie Warszawy

Books
 EWG a rynek światowy, 1965 (EEC and the World Market, published in Polish, translated into English, French, and German)
 Handel między krajami o różnych ustrojach. Po II wojnie światowej i prognozy do 1980 r., 1968 (Trade between countries with various constitutions. After WWII and forecasts till 1980)
 Muellerowie na codzień, 1979 (The Muellers in everyday life)
 Alarm dla gospodarki trwa, 1982 (Alarm for the economy)
 Nawigatorzy gospodarki i inne polemiki, 1987 (The navigators of the economics and other polemics)
 Pułapka energetyczna gospodarki polskiej, 1988 (The energetic trap of Polish economy)
 Bogactwo i nędza narodów, Dom Wydawniczy Elipsa, Warszawa 1996 (The wealth and poverty of nations)

Selected awards 
 1967, 1974 - Nagroda Klubu Publicystów Międzynarodowych SDP (Award of the International Columnist Club of the Polish Journalists Association)
 1974 - Nagroda Prezesa RSW Prasa-Książka-Ruch (Award of the President of the Ruch Prasa-Ksiazka-Ruch /Polish press publishers and distributors)
 1974 - I Nagroda Klubu Publicystów Ekonomicznych SDP (1st Award of the Economic Columnist Club of the Polish Journalists Association)
 Krzyż Oficerski OOP
 Złoty Krzyż Zasługi

References

20th-century Polish economists
20th-century Polish journalists
1923 births
2005 deaths